Chapter 6: Couples Therapy is the seventh studio album by American recording artist Syleena Johnson, released by Blakbyrd and eOne Music.

Critical reception

AllMusic editor Andy Kellman found that while Chapter 6: Couples Therapy "doesn't have the most appealing title, it reflects what Johnson has been through and covers a broader spectrum of emotions than indicated [...] There are many moods between [the] highlights, and they're all revealed with the same high level of conviction heard in Johnson's previous output [...] This is yet another pleasing, down-to-earth addition to one of the steadiest R&B discographies of the 2000s and 2010s."

Track listing

Charts

References

External links
 Official website

Syleena Johnson albums
2014 albums